1218 Part II is the seventh studio album by Mexican-American Chicano rap recording artist Lil Rob from San Diego, California. The album was set to be released in 2006, advertisement posters were created stating April 2007, but it ended up being pushed back because songs were being leaked. Lil Rob decided he needed to remake some songs that would differ from leaked tracks. Release date by Upstairs Records advertisements state October 21, 2008. The album leaked onto the Internet on October 18, 2008.

Track listing 

Rejected tracks
 "My Chick"
 "Keep Doing What You're Doing"
 "Bouncin'" (featuring Fingazz)

Sample credits
"Bang Bang Boogie" sampled "The Safety Dance" by Men Without Hats
"Fan Mail" sampled "Juicy" by Notorious B.I.G. and "Juicy Fruit" by Mtume
"Let Me Come Back" sampled "Baby Come Back" by Player
"Out of My Mind" sampled "I'm Gone" by Shirley and Lee and "What Can I Do?" by Donnie Elbert

Chart history

References

External links
1218, Pt. 2 by Lil Rob at AllMusic
1218 Part II by Lil Rob at Discogs
1218 Part II by Lil Rob on iTunes

2008 albums
Lil Rob albums
Sequel albums